Cupidon is a Belgian comics series written by Raoul Cauvin and drawn by Malik.

Publication history
Cupidon made its debut in the Franco-Belgian comics magazine Spirou on October 5, 1988. To date 19 albums have been published by Dupuis.

Synopsis
Cupidon features short stories about the adventures of a little Putto attempting to bring love on earth. His headquarters are in Heaven and he is dispatched by a (hot-tempered) Saint Peter.

With his bow and arrows, Cupidon is usually prone to blunders, bringing together people of contrasting personalities, even matching together animals not necessarily of the same species.

Albums

 Premières flèches, 1990
 Philtre d'amour, 1991
 Baiser de feu, 1991
 Souffle au cœur, 1992
 Arc en ciel, 1993
 L'Ange et l'eau, 1994
 Un amour de gorille, 1995
 Je l'aime un peu..., 1996
 Vive la mariée, 1997
 Coup de foudre, 1998
 Lune de miel, 1999
 Le Cœur dans les nuages, 2000
 Jour de chance, 2001
 Toutes les amours du monde, 2002
 Plus jamais seul, 2003
 Cadeau du ciel, 2004
 Amour en cage, 2005
 Rien que pour vous!, 2006
 Solitude, 2007

References

Sources

 Cupidon publications in Spirou BDoubliées 
 Cupidon albums Bedetheque

External links
 Cupidon on Dupuis official site

Belgian comic strips
Gag-a-day comics
1988 comics debuts
Comics characters introduced in 1988
Fictional angels
Dupuis titles
Child characters in comics
Male characters in comics